Jill Wruble is a radiologist and fellow at Johns Hopkins Medicine who is best known as a speaker on overdiagnosis due to incidental imaging finding in United States medicine.

Biography 
Wruble is a director at the National Association of Veteran Affairs Physicians and Dentists and a fellow at Johns Hopkins Medicine, in Radiology and Radiological Science. She retired from the United States Army with rank of major. She is a graduate of Williams College and the New York College of Osteopathic Medicine. She was a clinical assistant professor who taught residents at Yale School of Medicine as recently as 2016.

Work on incidentaloma 
Her TEDx Penn talk about these incidentalomas discussed how doctors treat abnormalities on tests, which lead to expensive further testing and potential overdiagnosis and overtreatment. In light of the COVID-19 pandemic and the reduced availability for elective surgeries in some areas, she is among the doctors calling for a reevaluation of aggressive cancer screenings and treatment that may cause harm to patients.

She says that with contemporary CT scans providing a large number of very detailed images, "[w]e now see things that we would have never seen before, like a lesion that may never be a problem" and that it's typical to see multiple abnormalities with each scan. Wruble is concerned with "the unintended consequences of medical testing" and along with co-author Joann Elmore has written about her skepticism of computer aided diagnosis as a tool for detecting breast cancer. A paper that she contributed to, "Effective Radiology Reporting" is often cited in papers on incidentaloma.

References

External links 
 Wruble’s TEDx talk

New York Institute of Technology alumni
Living people
Year of birth missing (living people)